The Central Entre Ríos Railway (CERR) (in Spanish: Ferrocarril Central Entrerriano) was a railway company in the Entre Ríos Province of Argentina, owned by the provincial government, which built and operated a  railway network between the rivers Paraná and Uruguay. In 1892 it was sold to the British–owned Entre Ríos Railway.

History 

On 11 June 1883 the provincial government of Entre Ríos authorised the construction of a railway from Paraná, the provincial capital, to Concepción del Uruguay, on the River Uruguay, and on 7 January 1887 the construction of branch lines to Victoria, Gualeguay, Gualeguaychú and Villaguay.

The line from Paraná, via Nogoyá and Rosario del Tala to Concepción ádel Uruguay was opened between 13 May and 30 June 1887, the branch line from Nogoyá to Victoria on 26 June 1890, and those from Basavilbaso to Parera and to Villaguay and from Parera to Gualeguaychú on 20 and 23 September of the same year. Finally a branch line, was opened on 27 January 1891, from Tala to Gualeguay, where it joined the Gualeguay to Puerto Ruiz  line operated by the Ferrocarril Primer Entrerrianno.

On 29 January 1892 the CERR was sold by the provincial government to the British-owned Entre Ríos Railway. Following nationalisation, the railway became part of the General Urquiza Railway.

See also
 General Urquiza Railway
 Entre Ríos Railway

References

Defunct railway companies of Argentina
Railway companies established in 1883
Railway companies disestablished in 1892
Standard gauge railways in Argentina
Transport in Entre Ríos Province